''
Troy Williamson (born April 30, 1983) is a former American football wide receiver who played in the National Football League (NFL) for five seasons. He was drafted by the Minnesota Vikings seventh overall in the 2005 NFL Draft. He played college football at South Carolina. He is widely considered to be the biggest bust in Minnesota Vikings history, with close consideration for the trade for Herschel Walker with the Dallas Cowboys.

Early years
Troy Williamson attended Silver Bluff High School in Aiken, South Carolina, and he was a letterman and excelled in both football and track. His mother (Shirley Williamson) had 11 kids. In football, as a senior, he rushed for 890 yards and caught 21 passes for 500 yards (23.8 yards per rec. avg.). He was an All-American, a consensus All-State selection, won Class-AA Player of the Year honors presented by the High School Sports Report, a Mr. Football finalist for the state of South Carolina, and helped lead his team to back-to-back state championships. After his senior season, he was rated the fifth-best wide receiver prospect in the Atlantic Region by PrepStar.

Track and field
In track, Williamson was a two-time 100 meters and 200 meters state champion, with personal bests of 10.35 and 20.79 seconds.

Personal bests

Professional career

Minnesota Vikings
The Vikings needed a receiver with deep speed after trading Randy Moss to Oakland, drafting Williamson with the 7th overall pick in the 2005 NFL Draft, using the pick acquired from trading Moss to Oakland. In the 2006−2007 off-season he claimed his hand-eye coordination was bad due to his depth perception and that was the reason for his 11 dropped balls, which tied for second in the NFL.
The Vikings 2007 season was equally difficult for Williamson, who finished with 240 yards and 1 touchdown. Most notably in the Vikings' finale, Williamson dropped two crucial passes. First, a wide-open Williamson dropped an almost-certain 72-yard touchdown pass from Tarvaris Jackson in the second quarter  and then another pass that would have yielded a critical first down later in the game.

Jacksonville Jaguars
After the 2007 season Williamson was traded for a 6th round pick to the Jacksonville Jaguars. The Vikings ended up using that pick to select Jaymar Johnson. Williamson controversially stated that he "wants to duke it out" with former Minnesota Vikings head coach Brad Childress because he had fined Troy $25,000 for attending his Grandmother's funeral (Childress rescinded the fine under pressure from team veterans), adding that they could "meet at the 50-yard line and go at it."  The Jaguars released Williamson on September 4, 2010.

NFL career statistics

References

External links
Jacksonville Jaguars bio
Minnesota Vikings bio
Jacksonville Trade

1983 births
Living people
American football wide receivers
Jacksonville Jaguars players
Minnesota Vikings players
Sportspeople from Aiken, South Carolina
Players of American football from South Carolina
South Carolina Gamecocks football players